The 2023 season is Balestier Khalsa's 28th consecutive season in the top flight of Singapore football and in the Singapore Premier League and the Singapore Cup.

Squad

Singapore Premier League

U21

Coaching staff

Transfer

In 

Pre-Season

Mid-Season

Loan In 

Pre-Season

Out 
Pre-Season

Mid-Season

Loan Return 
Pre-Season

Loan Out 
Pre-Season

Mid-Season

Extension / Retained

Friendly

Pre-Season Friendly

2023 Malaysia Tour (31 January - 4 February)

Team statistics

Appearances and goals

Numbers in parentheses denote appearances as substitute.

Competitions (SPL)

Overview

Singapore Premier League

Singapore Cup

Group

Competition (U21)

Stage 1
All 8 teams will be each other in a round robin format before breaking into 2 groups for another 3 matches.  A total of 10 matches will be played thru the season.

 League table

Stage 2

 League table

Competition (U17)

U17 League

League table

See also 
 2016 Balestier Khalsa FC season
 2017 Balestier Khalsa FC season
 2018 Balestier Khalsa FC season
 2019 Balestier Khalsa FC season
 2020 Balestier Khalsa FC season
 2021 Balestier Khalsa FC season
 2022 Balestier Khalsa FC season

Notes

References 

Balestier Khalsa FC
Balestier Khalsa FC seasons
2023
1